The Boy Who Died Wolf is the second studio album by American rock band Highly Suspect. It was recorded in Bogotá, Colombia and Brooklyn, New York. The album's lead single "My Name Is Human" reached No. 1 on Billboard's Mainstream Rock chart, the band's first single to do so, and was nominated for Best Rock Song at the 59th Annual Grammy Awards. The album's second single, "Little One", had reached number 2 on the same chart as of October 2017.

Track listing

Personnel
 Johnny Stevens – guitar, vocals, synthesizer, piano
 Rich Meyer – bass, backing vocals 
 Ryan Meyer – drums, backing vocals

Accolades

Charts

References

2016 albums
Highly Suspect albums